Vishal Kaith (born 22 July 1996) is an Indian professional footballer who plays as a goalkeeper for Indian Super League club ATK Mohun Bagan and the India national team.

Youth years
Having come up through the state level ranks for Himachal Pradesh, he was recruited by the AIFF to play for the under-16 and under-19 national sides before joining the AIFF Elite Academy in 2011 to play under-19 national league, before being picked up by Shillong Lajong.

Club career

Shillong Lajong
Vishal Kaith joined Shillong Lajong after spending a year at the AIFF Elite Academy in 2014 and made his official debut in the second game of his teams' 2014-15 Indian Federation Cup against Salgaocar and was adjudged as the Man of the Match. Kaith would go on to obtain the Man of the Match award in his second first team appearance against Mohun Bagan.

Kaith made his senior I-League debut on 28 March 2015 against Sporting Goa but was sent off in the 2nd-half for a handball outside the box. He saved penalty which was taken by Sunil Chettri against Bengaluru in Federation Cup. Kaith showed good progress in pre-season for the new season and he became a pivotal part of the club and started all matches for Lajong in 2015-16 I-League season.

Under the guidance of Thangboi Singto, Kaith became the first choice goalkeeper for Shillong Lajong in entire season. He started in all matches and kept half a dozen important clean sheets.

Pune City (loan)
On 25 May 2016, Indian Super League club Pune City signed Kaith on loan from Shillong Lajong for the third edition of league where he would be a squad 'keeper and would make no appearances during the season.

Chennaiyin
On August 31, 2019, Vishal Kaith signed for Chennaiyin on a long-term permanent deal with the club after spending the previous three seasons at Pune City.

ATK Mohun Bagan FC
In June 2022, Vishal Kaith signed for ATK Mohun Bagan on a three-year deal.

International career

Youth
Kaith was handed his India U19 debut on 4 October 2013 against Qatar U19 in 2014 AFC U-19 Championship Qualifiers. Kaith kept first clean sheet for India U19 against Nepal U19, in which India U19 defeated Nepal U19 by 1–0. In July 2017, Kaith represented India U23 in AFC U23 Championship Qualifiers which held in Qatar.

Senior
Kaith was called for India team camp before AFC Asian Cup Qualifiers match against Kyrgyzstan on 13 June.

Style of play
Kaith is a talented, complete, aggressive, and often instinctive goalkeeper, who is recognized for his reflexes, prowess, and anticipation when coming off his line in one on one situations, as well as his confidence, goalkeeping technique, reactions, and ability to get to ground quickly to collect, parry, or even challenge for the ball with his feet; when playing in teams that rely upon high defensive lines, he has often functioned as a sweeper-keeper, frequently rushing out of his area to clear the ball or face opponents who have beaten the offside trap.

Career statistics

Club

Honours 

India
 SAFF Championship: 2021
 Intercontinental Cup: 2018

References

Indian footballers
India international footballers
1996 births
Living people
People from Shimla district
Shillong Lajong FC players
I-League players
FC Pune City players
Indian Super League players
Footballers from Himachal Pradesh
India youth international footballers
Association football goalkeepers
2019 AFC Asian Cup players
Chennaiyin FC players